Dolní Studénky is a municipality and village in Šumperk District in the Olomouc Region of the Czech Republic. It has about 1,400 inhabitants.

Administrative parts
The village of Králec is an administrative part of Dolní Studénky.

Geography

History
The first written mention of Dolní Studénky is from 1353, when it was owned by Jan of Kravaře. The history of the village is connected with the village of Třemešek (today a small hamlet within Králec) where the seat of the nobility was located. From 1437 to 1509, it was owned by the Tunkl of Brníčko family, who founded a system of ponds here. Another notable owners were the Zierotin family, who held it in 1527–1559 and then again in 1653–1771. In 1559–1653, the estate was owned by the Bukůvka family, who had a Renaissance castle built in Třemešek.

The German name of the village Schönbrunn was first documented in 1718. After the World War II, the German population was expelled.

Demographics

Culture
The annual international brass music festival Hudba bez hranic ("Music Without Borders") takes place in Dolní Studénky. It was founded in 2005.

Sights
The most valuable building is the Třemešek Castle. The originally Renaissance castle from the 1580s was rebuilt in the Neoclassical style in the mid-19th century. Today, it serves the Centre for Social Services, which operates a cafe and apartments for the disabled.

References

External links

Villages in Šumperk District